GoodLife Fitness Centres Inc. is the largest health club company in Canada with over 450 locations across the country, under the banner of four brands.

History and background 

GoodLife was founded in 1979 in London, Ontario by David Patchell-Evans. After suffering multiple broken bones following a motorcycle accident, Patchell-Evans began to workout following rehabilitation. He later bought the gym he exercised in.

Brands 
In addition to more than 350 clubs under the GoodLife Fitness brand, the company also operates multiple other fitness companies including Fit4Less, Éconofitness (Quebec), Revo Fitness (Australia) and CityFitness (New Zealand). GoodLife also owns the yoga and Pilates-focused Oxygen Yoga & Fitness. Between GoodLife Fitness and all of its sister brands, the company operates over 450 different fitness locations in Canada.

Acquisitions 
GoodLife purchased the 'Alliance' and 'Family Fitness' club chains in 2007–2008. By October 2011, the brand had over 275 clubs across Canada. In 2009, GoodLife Fitness expanded into Eastern Canada by acquiring Nubody's family of clubs. GoodLife Fitness also partnered with Energie Cardio in Quebec in that same year. GoodLife Fitness has been rumored to be taking over the Target Canada locations, that are currently abandoned.

In December 2012, Goodlife acquired seven independently operated Gold's Gym locations in Canada. The locations include three clubs in Calgary and one in Airdrie, Alberta, as well as locations in Peterborough, Vaughan and Scarborough in Ontario. This made GoodLife the largest fitness club chain in the Calgary Region with 13 locations. The total number of GoodLife Clubs in Alberta increased to 16, spanning from Calgary to Lethbridge to Edmonton.

On April 1, 2013, GoodLife Fitness announced its acquisition of Extreme Fitness Inc., a leading operator of fitness clubs in the Greater Toronto Area and surrounding region. This acquisition brought the total number of GoodLife Fitness Clubs in Canada to over 300, with 82 in the Greater Toronto Area.

Partnerships

GoodLife and Les Mills International 
In June 2005, GoodLife became the official Canadian Agent of Les Mills International programs, the world's largest provider of choreographed exercise-to-music group fitness classes.

Jillian Michaels Bodyshred 
In February 2013, GoodLife Fitness announced a partnership to become the exclusive provider of Jillian Michaels BODYSHRED in Canada.

24 Hour Fitness (U.S.) 
In September 2015, GoodLife Fitness announced a partnership with 24 Hour Fitness in the United States. Now GoodLife Fitness members can use over 400 locations with their Canada-Wide membership across the U.S. and vice versa.

Criticism and controversy

Controversy over misleading ads 
In 2005, a federal Competition Bureau investigation found that GoodLife Fitness clubs had published misleading ads. In a settlement, Goodlife Fitness published a corrective notice in newspapers throughout central Canada and on its website, paying a $75,000 penalty and agreeing not to make false/misleading representations in future marketing.

Great Big Gym Ripoff survey 
In January 2011, GoodLife Fitness came in second place in the CBC Big Gym Ripoff survey ranking gyms with the most problems with over-billing and cancellations.

Controversy over sales tactics 
In January 2011, GoodLife Fitness was caught in a media backlash, after one customer who was attempting to cancel his membership was roughed-up by security guards at its Rideau Centre location; And after another, at its Orleans location, was chastised and banned for chatting about the benefits of other fitness clubs. The incidents drew attention to strong armed-sales tactics reported by employees and clients.

Controversy over telemarketing practices 
In 2011, GoodLife Fitness was fined $300,000 for illegally using automated calling devices, known as robocalls, to contact its members, without their prior consent, to advertise the opening of a new club . As part of a settlement with the CRTC, Goodlife Fitness published notices about the violation in newspapers and on its website.

Class action over compensation practices 
In October 2016, a class action lawsuit was launched against Goodlife Fitness alleging that it had failed to pay certain employees of its Ontario gyms some of the wages they were owed under Ontario law. The members of the proposed class would have included all non-managerial employees for a period beginning October 14, 2014. In July 2018, the court approved a $7.5 million settlement of the proposed class action.

In media
GoodLife Fitness has taken part in Undercover Boss Canada and Canada Sings.

References

Health clubs
Medical and health organizations based in Canada
Privately held companies of Canada
Companies based in London, Ontario
Health care companies established in 1979
1979 establishments in Ontario